David Mercer may refer to:
 Sir David Mercer (Royal Marines officer)  (1864–1920), British Royal Marines officer
 David Mercer (footballer, born 1893) (1893–1950), England international footballer
 David Mercer (footballer, born 1918) (1918–1986), English footballer
 David Mercer (playwright) (1928–1980), English dramatist
 David Henry Mercer (1857–1919), U.S. Representative from Nebraska
 David Mercer (broadcaster) (1950–2020), British sports presenter
 David Mercer (weightlifter) (born 1961), British Olympic weightlifter
 David Mercer (cricketer) (born 1962), English cricketer
 David Mercer (writer) (born 1976), technical writer
 David Mercer (alpine skier) (born 1960), British former alpine skier
 David Mercer (racing driver) (born 1949), British former racing driver
 David Mercer (political commentator) (1961-2021), American former Democratic fundraiser, commentator

See also
 David Mercer MacDougall (1904–1991), colonial secretary of Hong Kong, 1945–1949